The 2017 Zhengzhou Women's Tennis Open was a professional tennis tournament played on indoor hard courts. It was the fourth edition of the tournament and part of the 2017 WTA 125K series, offering a total of $125,000 in prize money. It took place in Zhengzhou, China, on 17–23 April 2017.

Singles main draw entrants

Seeds 

 1 Rankings as of 10 April 2017.

Other entrants 
The following players received wildcards into the singles main draw:
  Liu Chang
  Peng Shuai
  Tang Haochen
  Xu Yifan
  Yang Zhaoxuan

The following players received entry from the qualifying draw:
  Guo Hanyu
  Kang Jiaqi
  Peangtarn Plipuech
  Varatchaya Wongteanchai

Doubles entrants

Seeds 

 1 Rankings as of 10 April 2017.

Champions

Singles

 Wang Qiang def.  Peng Shuai, 3–6, 7–6(7–3), 1–1 ret.

Doubles

 Han Xinyun /  Zhu Lin def.  Jacqueline Cako /  Julia Glushko, 7–5, 6–1

External links 
 
 Official website 

2017 WTA 125K series
2017 in Chinese tennis
Zhengzhou Open